Gerald Carl Meyers (born December 5, 1928), former chairman and CEO of American Motors Corporation (AMC) is an industrialist, author, lecturer, and management consultant.

Early life
Born December 5, 1928, in Buffalo, New York, Meyers attended public schools and in 1950 earned a Bachelor of Science in engineering and in 1954 a Master of Science magna cum laude in business from Carnegie Mellon University. He joined the Ford Motor Company in 1950, but his work at the automaker was cut by military service. Meyers was an officer in the U.S. Air Force during the Korean War.

Meyers next worked for Chrysler Corporation. During the eight years with the automaker, he became Director of Manufacturing for the company's overseas plants in 1961 and lived in Geneva, Switzerland for three years.

American Motors
In 1962 Meyers was appointed director of purchasing for American Motors Corporation in Detroit. He was promoted to director of manufacturing, vice-president of manufacturing, vice-president of the product (engineering) group, and executive vice-president. In charge of product development, Meyers introduced AMC's innovative "AMC Buyer Protection Plan" that included the industry's first 12-month or  bumper-to-bumper warranty. The number of models was reduced to remove basic, stripped versions, but the centerpiece was improved quality during the production, although Meyers said "I don't claim we've magically and finally licked all the problems of the assembly line." Other improvements included mechanical upgrades to increase durability and quality, as well as improved standard equipment levels. By 1973, Meyers was pushing the development of the Wankel engine for installation into an AMC car within two years, possibility of going independent of GM's rotary engineering work, but he ruled out AMC producing the new engine itself. While Meyers was AMC's top product man, he was "given considerable, and justifiable, credit for pushing the AMX/3 project from inception through the design and prototype stages into testing."

A major management transition at AMC stated on May 24, 1977, then Meyers was named president and Chief Operating Officer, succeeding the retiring William Luneburg. Although, Meyers was the executive who had been against AMC's purchase of Jeep in 1970 (of which the press kept reminding him), he was now one of Jeep's biggest proponents. Meyers did not have all the powers as Luneburg because he did not report to the CEO and chairman, Roy D. Chapin Jr., but to the vice-chairman of the board of directors, R. William McNeally, who was also a rival to be the next chairman.

Upon the retirement of Chapin on October 21, 1977, Meyers became chairman and chief executive officer. At the time, Meyers was 49 years old and became the youngest top executive in the automobile industry bringing a wealth of manufacturing experience. "The company was looking for a lot more than a steady hand on the tiller – it was looking for a savior" but Meyers disagreed and argued that the company could survive and remain a factor in the automobile industry by abandoning its policy of head-on competition and instead focusing on and revamping its four-wheel-drive vehicles, a market segment left untended by the large automakers, and by acquiring advanced technology.

For fiscal 1977, AMC's profits more than doubled compared to the previous year to a record $83.9 million on sales of $3.1 billion. The smallest U.S. automaker saw its car sales increase 37%, while they dropped 21% for the industry as a whole. Meyers described AMC strategy as a "three-legged stool" of small cars, Jeeps, and steady government and military contracts. By 1979, the automaker's management team headed by Meyers, ... "sharply cut back its money-losing car operations ... The perennially ailing baby of the auto industry suddenly looks healthy, and its new management team has a clear design for the future."

In 1979, Meyers formed a partnership with the French state-owned Renault, which bought 22.5 percent of AMC stock. However, the U.S. economy continued to decline through 1981, and AMC now held on to only two percent of the domestic market and lost about $300 million during the previous two years. Meyers had acknowledged that AMC had no hope of raising the $6 billion it needed to finance more competitive products, stating "It would take dough that just isn't in the cards for us," so the company staked its future on help from Renault, which included development of the Renault Alliance sub-compact for production in Kenosha, Wisconsin. In early 1982, AMC asked its 16,000 hourly workers for wage concessions that would save the automaker $150 million.

At age 53, Meyers retired from the company in February 1982, by which time Renault controlled 46 percent of American Motors. He was with the automaker 20 years and was noted for orchestrating "the complicated linkup between AMC and Renault starting in 1979." Meyers was succeeded as chairman by former AMC President W. Paul Tippett Jr. At the time, Tippett was a member of AMC management for only three years.

Retirement
Meyers was the Ford Distinguished Research Chair and Professor of Business at Carnegie Mellon University's Graduate School of Industrial Administration. He has written a book about business crisis management and co-authored another. Meyers is now a business consultant and public speaker with expertise in the auto industry and business administration. He is also a Visiting Professor of Organizational Behavior at the University of Michigan Ross School of Business in Ann Arbor.

He is President of Gerald C. Meyers Associates, a management consulting firm that assists and advises senior corporate officers. An expert in corporate governance and crisis management, he is also a commentator on the automobile industry.

On April 17, 2007, he received an honorary degree, doctorate of business practice, from Carnegie Mellon University.

Author
Gerald C. Meyers wrote When It Hits the Fan, Managing the Nine Crises of Business, published by Houghton-Mifflin. He also co-authored Dealers, Healers, Brutes & Saviors, Eight Winning Styles for Solving Giant Business Crises with his daughter, Susan Meyers, published by John Wiley & Sons in 2000.

References

External links
Dealers, Healers, Brutes & Saviors

Living people
1928 births
20th-century American businesspeople
Carnegie Mellon University College of Engineering alumni
Tepper School of Business alumni
Carnegie Mellon University faculty
American chief executives in the automobile industry
American Motors people
Ford people
Chrysler people